Nate 'n Al Delicatessen is located in Beverly Hills, California. The restaurant opened in 1945, occasionally serving as an informal meeting place for show business personalities.

History
Nate 'n Al was started in 1945 by friends Al Mendelson and Nate Rimer. The two met in a Detroit deli twenty years before, and came up with the idea of opening their own deli. They moved to California and opened their deli calling it Nate ‘n Al, in Beverly Hills. It had an initial capacity of thirty persons.

Many of the original recipes are still used in the restaurant today, and over the years the deli has earned many accolades.

Ratings 
LA Weekly ranked the deli's matzo ball soup #1 in the magazine's "Top 5 Matzo Ball Soups in Los Angeles".  CBS/Los Angeles ranked the deli's Corned Beef Reuben Sandwich on its list of the "Best Reubens in Los Angeles". 

In 2015, Nate 'n Al was awarded the Will Rogers Award for Best Historic Restaurant in Beverly Hills.

Ownership 
After remaining a family restaurant for three generations, in February 2018, it was rumored that the original owners planned to sell the restaurant, possibly leading to its closure. In January 2019, it was announced that a group of investors including Rande Gerber and Cindy Crawford, Mike Meldman, Jeff Shell, and Jay Sures would purchase the deli and keep it open.

Noted guests 
Nate 'n Al is a favored dining place of, among Hollywood Showbiz personalities, Larry King and Nora Ephron. Other noted guests include:

 Doris Day
 Nancy Sinatra
 Rita Hayworth
 Ava Gardner
 James Garner
 Mike Myers
 David Crosby
 Kareem Abdul-Jabbar
 Larry King
 Nora Ephron
 Lew Wasserman
 Casey Wasserman
 Robert Kraft
 Jeffrey Katzenberg
 Shelli and Irving Azoff

See also

 List of delicatessens

References

External links 
Food Paradise on Travel Channel feature
 Nate'n Al Delicatessen receives Will Rogers Award for Best Historic Restaurant
 Nate'n Al featured on Hanging with Harris with special guest Simon Majumdar

Companies based in Beverly Hills, California
Delicatessens in California